Triethyl citrate is an ester of citric acid.  It is a colorless, odorless liquid used as a food additive, emulsifier and solvent (E number E1505) to stabilize foams, especially as whipping aid  for egg white. It is also used in pharmaceutical coatings and plastics.

Triethyl citrate is also used as a plasticizer for polyvinyl chloride (PVC) and similar plastics.

Triethyl citrate has been used as a pseudo-emulsifier in e-cigarette juices. It functions essentially like lecithin used in food products, but with the possibility of vaporization which lecithin does not have.

References

Ethyl esters
Citrate esters
Excipients
E-number additives